Bill Schmidt (born December 29, 1947) is a retired male American javelin thrower from the Pittsburgh suburb of Southview, Pennsylvania. He is the son of Helen and Louis Schmidt, and won the bronze medal at the 1972 Summer Olympics.

His dad was born in Germany and came to the United States at the age of 7. His dad was a coal miner for 29 years and marched with John L Lewis, the UMW organizer and President. Bill is the youngest of seven children, six boys and one girl. He has an identical twin named Bob Schmidt.

He attended Canon McMillan Senior High School in Canonsburg, Pennsylvania and competed in football and track and field. He played linebacker and threw the javelin. His personal best in the javelin was 204'4". He played American Legion Baseball and made the Western Pennsylvania All Star Team. He also had a tryout with professional baseball. Bill graduated in June 1965.

In 1966 he was a walkon track and field athlete at North Texas State University (later named University of North Texas) in Denton, TX. He later earned a full scholarship, throwing the javelin. His sophomore year his best throw was 219'2", his junior year 253'1" and his senior year 280'7". He earned All American honors and placed second at the NCAA Championships in 1970 at Des Moines, IA. He was also named track captain his senior year. He graduated in August 1970 with a Bachelor of Business Administration (BBA) degree with a major in Business and minors in Psychology and Personnel Management. He competed in the World University Games in Turin, Italy in September 1970.

On September 20, 1970 he was drafted into the United States Army. He did his Basic Training at Ft. Dix, NJ and his Advanced Infantry Training at Ft. Polk, LA. He was stationed at Ft. Ord, CA, Ft. MacArthur, CA and The United States Military Academy at West Point, NY. He competed in the CISM (Conseil International du Sport Militaire) Games, the World Military Championships with competition in over 20 sports and 40 countries. He won the military championships, setting a new world military record in the javelin at Turku, Finland in August 1971.

He competed for the United States in the 1972 Summer Olympics held in Munich, Germany in the javelin throw where he won the bronze medal. He still remains the only American to medal in the javelin event in the last 64 years.

During the Munich Massacre by Palestinian terrorists at the 1972 Olympics, Israeli racewalker Shaul Ladany awakened and alerted American track coach Bill Bowerman, who called for the U.S. Marines to come and protect Schmidt and fellow American Jewish Olympian swimmer Mark Spitz.

He earned a post graduate scholarship and attended The University of Tennessee, Knoxville, TN. There he earned a Master of Science (MS) degree in Business Education with a concentration in accounting in 1976. He taught in the Knoxville City Schools at Central High School in Knoxville, TN and coached boys and girls cross country and track. He won the USA National Championships in the javelin at UCLA in 1978 and was named "Javelin Thrower of the Decade" (the 1970s)in the United States by Track and Field News. His career best was 283'2".

In the sports marketing world he is considered a pioneer and a giant in the industry. He was named by the Sporting News as one of "The 100 most Powerful People in Sports" in 1996 and 1998. In 2014 The Sports Business Daily/Global/Journal awarded its Champions Award to Schmidt recognizing him as a Pioneer & Innovator in Sports Business.

His career positions include Director of Sports at the 1982 World's Fair Knoxville, TN 1982, Director of Development, Stokely Van Camp, Indianapolis, IN 1983, Vice President of Sports at the Los Angeles Olympics, Los Angeles, CA 1984, Vice President of Worldwide Sports Marketing at Gatorade, Chicago, IL 1984–1999, Chief Executive Officer (CEO) Oakley Inc., Foothills Ranch, CA 1999 and presently President, Pegasus Sports Marketing, Knoxville, TN. He is also an Adjunct Professor in the Department of Exercise, Sport and Leisure Studies The University of Tennessee, Knoxville, TN.

In 2013 Schmidt was inducted into the Greater Knoxville Sports Hall of Fame.

He is an avid sports fan, motorcycle enthusiast and golfer.

References

 

American male javelin throwers
Olympic bronze medalists for the United States in track and field
Athletes (track and field) at the 1972 Summer Olympics
Jewish American sportspeople
People from Washington County, Pennsylvania
Sportspeople from the Pittsburgh metropolitan area
Track and field athletes from Pennsylvania
American twins
Twin sportspeople
Medalists at the 1972 Summer Olympics
Universiade medalists in athletics (track and field)
Living people
1947 births
Universiade silver medalists for the United States
Medalists at the 1975 Summer Universiade
21st-century American Jews